Harold N. "Barney" Jackson (March 18, 1904 – March 17, 1971) was an American politician in the state of Washington. He served in the Washington House of Representatives and Washington State Senate.

References

1904 births
1971 deaths
Democratic Party members of the Washington House of Representatives
20th-century American politicians
Democratic Party Washington (state) state senators